Beach Boys' Party! is the tenth studio album by American rock band the Beach Boys, and their third in 1965, consisting mostly of cover songs played with acoustic instruments. It reached No. 6 in the US and No. 3 in the UK. The album spawned one single, a cover of the Regents' "Barbara Ann", which reached No. 2 in the US and No. 3 in the UK, and was their highest-charting British single to that point.

Party! was recorded in a music studio and presented as an impromptu live recording of a party, with informal chatter by friends and family overdubbed later.  The record company, Capitol, wanted an album for the holiday season, but as there was no new material ready, several options were considered, including a greatest hits album and a live album, before the band decided on the party theme. The Beach Boys covered songs by the Beatles, several doo-wop groups, Bob Dylan, and the Everly Brothers, as well as two of their own earlier hits performed in a tongue-in-cheek style.  While the "beach party" atmospherics fit into the Beach Boys style to that point, the varied musical influences presaged the change of direction that would occur over the next several years beginning with Pet Sounds (1966).

Because of its stripped-down approach, Party! is considered to be the first "unplugged" type album. In 2015, Capitol issued Beach Boys' Party! Uncovered and Unplugged, an 81-track expansion and remix of Party!.

Background and recording
In August, after the release of Summer Days (And Summer Nights!!), the Beach Boys' leader Brian Wilson was contemplating his next studio effort, which would turn out to be Pet Sounds. Capitol Records requested a new album for the holiday season. Since The Beach Boys' Christmas Album had been released the previous year, as had a live performance via Beach Boys Concert, the "live party" idea was selected to reflect the togetherness of the holiday spirit. Sporadically during September, the band and their friends rehearsed current and older hits (including revisiting the Rivingtons' "Papa-Oom-Mow-Mow"). Although presented as an impromptu live recording of a continuous set of songs played at a small party, the songs were recorded and mixed individually in a sound studio as any regular studio album, and laughter and background chatter was mixed in during post-production.

The album included versions of the Beatles' "Tell Me Why", "You've Got to Hide Your Love Away" and "I Should Have Known Better"; "Devoted to You" by the Everly Brothers; the Phil Spector produced "There's No Other (Like My Baby)" and a send-up of their own "I Get Around" and "Little Deuce Coupe". David Leaf noted: "In an era when rock stars were beginning to take themselves more seriously, the Beach Boys showed how natural it was to make fun of themselves."

Author Geoffrey Himes wrote that the party theme was created to justify the casual arrangements. Music theorist Daniel Harrison wrote: "Party was an exercise in minimalistic production. ... The performances seem unrehearsed, the instrumental support is minimal (acoustical [sic] guitar, bongo drums, tambourine), and fooling around (laughing, affected singing, background conversation) pervades every track." It was Wilson's first exploration in "party tracks," a form of music which includes the sounds of people shouting and making noises as if at a party. He would continue this approach with Smiley Smile in 1967.

Several other songs were also recorded, but not put on the album. This included renditions of the Drifters' "Ruby Baby," the Beatles' song "Ticket to Ride," the Rolling Stones' "(I Can't Get No) Satisfaction," Bob Dylan's "Blowin' in the Wind" and the Robins' "Riot In Cell Block #9."

Promotion
The original release of Party! included a sheet of photographs which depicted the band at a party.  In order to promote the album, Capitol distributed to dealers a million bags of potato chips which bore the album's cover art, intended to be given away to record buyers for free. The label also coordinated a motion floor merchandiser containing five Beach Boys LPs, full-color streamers for window displays, and full-scale radio and newspaper advertising.

Reception

Billboard evaluated that Party! would have strong sales potential: "The boys have a ball performing in this intimate, ad-lib program of hot material. ... [an] exciting, discotheque package."

In November 1965, the Beach Boys released the non-album single "The Little Girl I Once Knew" which repeatedly used a measure of silence in the arrangement and was reportedly disliked by radio programmers owing to their avoidance of having "dead air"; this has been cited as being partially responsible for the single stalling at US number 20. Still wanting to play new material by the band, radio disc jockeys around the United States began playing the last track of Party! straight off the LP, a cover of The Regents' "Barbara Ann." It received good listener response and was issued as a single by Capitol when they started hearing from radio programmers; it became a number 2 hit in early 1966.

Retrospective reviews
Richie Unterberger wrote: "In recent years, this album has gone up a few notches in critical esteem, praised for its loose, casual feel and insight into the group's influences. Realistically, though, its present-day appeal lies mostly with dedicated fans of the group, as fun and engaging as it is. Others will find the material shopworn in places, and the presentation too corny." Writer Jim Fusilli said: "This Beach Boys Party! really blows. ... They mock 'I Get Around' and 'Little Deuce Coupe.' Imagine doing that—mocking your own work, music some people cherish." Mitchell Cohen of the publication Best Classic Bands wrote that Party! is more reminiscent of the Beatles' Get Back sessions than the first "unplugged" album, observing: "Brian is there, but he doesn’t do very much, ... [His production] credit seems almost insulting, because for the most part it’s Mike’s show, even more so on the naked sessions ... Carl and Dennis grab on to the Beatles tunes like a life raft, and Brian is in the corner. This isn’t his party, but he’ll have to clean up when it’s over."

Alternate releases 

In 1990, Beach Boys' Party! was paired on CD with Stack-o-Tracks with bonus instrumental tracks. The bonus instrumental tracks include "Help Me, Rhonda", "California Girls", and "Our Car Club". In 2012, the first stereo mix of Beach Boys' Party! was released.

On November 20, 2015, Capitol issued an 81-track expanded remix, Beach Boys' Party! Uncovered and Unplugged, containing the original album without overdubs followed by a selection of outtakes culled from the album's original five recording sessions.

Track listing

Personnel
Credits from band archivist Craig Slowinski.

The Beach Boys
 Al Jardine – vocals, acoustic 6 and 12 string guitars, ashtray
 Bruce Johnston – vocals, electric bass
 Mike Love – vocals
 Brian Wilson – vocals, bass, piano, bongos
 Carl Wilson – vocals, acoustic 6 and 12 string guitars, bass
 Dennis Wilson – vocals, bongos, castanet, harmonica

Guests

 Hal Blaine – bongos
 Ray Avery – bongos
 Steve Korthof – bongos, tambourine
 Ron Swallow – tambourine
 Terry Melcher – tambourine
 Billy Hinsche – harmonica on "Mountain Of Love"
 Dean Torrence – co-lead vocal on "Barbara Ann"
 Marilyn Wilson – vocals

Charts

Chart information courtesy of Allmusic and other music databases.

Notes

References 

Sources
 
 
 
 
 
 Beach Boys' Party! Uncovered and Unplugged liner notes.

External links

The Beach Boys albums
1965 albums
Capitol Records albums
Covers albums
Albums produced by Brian Wilson
Albums recorded at United Western Recorders